Madame Double X is a 1914 short film starring Wallace Beery, Robert Bolder and Ben Turpin.  The short was produced by the Essanay Film Manufacturing Company and distributed by the General Film Company.

Cast
Wallace Beery	...	
Madame Double X
Robert Bolder	...	
Mr. Von Crooks, Sr.
Ben Turpin	...	
Mr. Von Crooks, Jr.
Leo White

External links
  Madame Double X in the Internet Movie Database

1914 films
American black-and-white films
American silent short films
1910s American films